The 2012 Monmouthshire County Council Election took place on 3 May 2012 to elect members of Monmouthshire County Council in Wales.  This was on the same day as other 2012 United Kingdom local elections. The Council shifted from Conservative to No Overall Control. The election was preceded by the 2008 elections and followed by the 2017 elections.

Results

|}

References

2012
Monmouthshire
21st century in Monmouthshire